FK Pehchevo is a football club from Pehčevo, North Macedonia. They are recently competed in the Macedonian Second League.

History

The club was founded in 1975. In 2015, the club purchased by businessman Kiril Gogov and renamed to Kit-Go Pehchevo to associate it with the chain of markets with the same name. In 2022, Kiril Gogov sold Kit-Go and as such the club changed its name to simply FK Pehchevo.

Current squad  
As of 4 July 2022.

References

External links

Club info at MacedonianFootball 
Football Federation of Macedonia 
Official website 

Football clubs in North Macedonia
Association football clubs established in 2015
2015 establishments in the Republic of Macedonia
FK